South Milford is a village and civil parish located in the Selby District, in the county of North Yorkshire, England. The civil parish includes the hamlet of Lumby, located south-west of the main village.

The village was historically part of the West Riding of Yorkshire until 1974.

Traditionally an agricultural village, the population has recently boomed due to housing development. South Milford is now generally considered a commuter village for nearby towns and cities because of the local motorway network, including the A1(M), M1 and M62. Still, South Milford maintains links with the local farming community.

Overview

South Milford is served by South Milford railway station, part of the Leeds and Selby Railway. It has been in operation since 1834.

Steeton Hall

Steeton Hall Gateway is a listed ancient monument and is protected by English Heritage. The gateway originally served a large hall, which was demolished and replaced by a house, which has since been converted into several dwellings. The gateway dates from the 15th century, and is one of four such structures which marked the corners of the estate. It has two arched passages, the large one in the centre to allow horsemen and carriages through and the smaller one to the left for footmen.

There are a spiral staircase which leads into a large room above the arch and a number of shields and coats of arms surrounding the structure.

Steeton Hall Gateway has been described as a "fair and stately structure in the brave days of old".

References

External links

South Milford Parish Council website
South Milford website
South Milford Cricket Club
South Milford Women's Institute
South Milford Village Bonfire
  South Milford was in this parish
 Page at English Heritage

Civil parishes in North Yorkshire
English Heritage sites in North Yorkshire
Selby District
Villages in North Yorkshire